The Zhengzhou–Xi'an high-speed railway, also known as the Zhengxi passenger line, is a high-speed railway line operated by China Railway High-speed connecting Zhengzhou and Xi'an, the provincial capitals of Henan and Shaanxi, respectively. It went into operation on February 6, 2010.

The line is one of the segments of the Xuzhou–Lanzhou high-speed railway, a high-speed mainline from Lanzhou to Xuzhou, paralleling the existing Longhai Railway line.

The densely populated corridor between Zhengzhou and Xi'an, both large regional centres, is home to some 100 million people.

When the high-speed line first opened, the trains departed and arrived at the "old" main train stations of Zhengzhou and Xi'an. Once the new Xi'an North railway station was opened all high-speed service in Xi'an was routed to it. In Zhengzhou now both the Zhengzhou Railway Station and the new Zhengzhou East railway station are served by high-speed trains from Xi'an.

The faster, G-series trains on the Zhengzhou–Xi'an Railway are numbered G20xx. Westbound trains (Zhengzhou to Xi'an) are odd-numbered, while even numbers denote eastbound trains (Xi'an to Zhengzhou).

With the opening of the Zhengzhou–Wuhan section of the Beijing–Guangzhou high-speed railway in the fall of 2012, direct high-speed service from Xi'an to Wuhan, Changsha, Guangzhou and Shenzhen was introduced. As well, after the Beijing-Shijiazhuang-Zhengzhou section of the Beijing–Guangzhou line becomes operational at the end of 2012, direct Xi'an-Beijing service became available.

The railway has made air service between Zhengzhou and Xi'an uncompetitive. All passenger flights between the two cities were suspended within 48 days of start of regular high-speed rail service.

Construction 
Construction work began on September 25, 2005, the railway opened for service on February 6, 2010.

Ten railway stations were built along the line: Zhouzhou West, Gongyi South, Luoyang Longmen, Mianchi South, Sanmenxia South, Lingbao West, Huashan North, Weinan North, Lintong East, and Xi'an North.

Accidents 
On November 14, 2009, a track inspection train seriously damaged  of the tracks near Huashan North Railway Station during a test run. The damaged section had to be removed and replaced. The railway was originally expected to be opened in December 2009, but the accident delayed the opening of the railway for at least one month.

References

Further reading 
 Project Information Document: 37487: Xi'an-Zhengzhou Railway Development (Asian Development Bank)

External links 
 Route on OpenStreetMap

High-speed railway lines in China
Standard gauge railways in China
2
Railway lines opened in 2010